Fanfreluche was a French-language Canadian children's television show made in Quebec by Radio-Canada. The show made its debut in 1968 and ran for forty-six episodes until 1971. It starred Fanfreluche, a living doll (played by Kim Yaroshevskaya) who retold fairy tales and legends to the viewers. When the story went a way that displeased her, she would physically enter it to "fix" the ending which sometimes put her in a perilous situation.

The character of Fanfreluche (played by the same actress) had its debut in another Radio-Canada children's show called La Boîte à surprise. From the character in this show, prominent Montreal businessman and Thoroughbred horse breeder Jean-Louis Lévesque named one of his fillies Fanfreluche. Believed to have used the name to please a grandchild, Levesque's filly became a Canadian and United States champion racehorse in 1970.

References 
 Fanfreluche at the IMDb database

See also 
List of Quebec television series
Television of Quebec
Culture of Quebec

Television shows filmed in Quebec
1960s Canadian children's television series
1970s Canadian children's television series
Ici Radio-Canada Télé original programming
1968 Canadian television series debuts
Canadian television shows featuring puppetry